Harry Hunter was an Australian footballer.

Harry Hunter may also refer to:

Harry Hunter (sailor) (1925–1988), British Olympic sailor
Harry Hunter (1840–1906), English music hall performer and co-founder of Francis, Day & Hunter Ltd.
Harry Hunter, a character in How to Save a Marriage and Ruin Your Life
Harry Hunter, namesake of Hunter's Hot Springs in Oregon

See also

Henry Hunter (disambiguation)
Harold Hunter (disambiguation)